Lantanai (Daantanai) is an East Papuan language spoken in the mountains of southern Bougainville Province, Papua New Guinea. It is spoken in Piruneu and Warana villages.

References

Languages of the Autonomous Region of Bougainville
South Bougainville languages